Tre Norwood (born April 19, 1999) is an American football free safety for the Pittsburgh Steelers of the National Football League (NFL). He played college football at Oklahoma, and was drafted by the Steelers in the seventh round of the 2021 NFL Draft.

College career
In July 2016, he committed to play college football for Louisville; in January 2017, he de-committed from Louisville.

Norwood played college football at Oklahoma from 2017 to 2020.

Professional career

Norwood was drafted by the Pittsburgh Steelers in the seventh round, 245th overall, of the 2021 NFL Draft. On May 15, 2021, he signed his four-year rookie contract with Pittsburgh.

References

External links
Pittsburgh Steelers bio
Oklahoma Sooners bio

1999 births
Living people
American football defensive backs
Oklahoma Sooners football players
Pittsburgh Steelers players
Players of American football from Arkansas
Sportspeople from Fort Smith, Arkansas